The 1970 First National Tennis Classic – Doubles was an event of the 1970 First National Tennis Classic men's tennis tournament and was played at the Louisville Tennis Center in Louisville, Kentucky in the United States from July 29 through August 3, 1970. The draw consisted of eight teams. John Newcombe and Tony Roche won the singles title, defeating Roy Emerson and Rod Laver in the final, 8–6, 5–7, 6–4.

Draw

References

External links
 ITF tournament edition details

Louisville Open
Louisville Open
Louisville Open
1970 in American tennis
Louisville Open